Alviri-Vidari is a dialect of the Tati language, spoken in Iran, near Saveh in the Markazi Province. Alvir and Vidar are the villages of speakers.

References

Northwestern Iranian languages